Ursula "Ulla" Burchardt (born 22 April 1954 in Dortmund, North Rhine-Westphalia) is a German politician and member of the SPD.

Political career
Burchardt was first elected to the German Bundestag in the 1994 elections. Throughout her time in parliament, she was a member of the Committee on Education, Research and Technology; from 2009, she served as the committee's chairwoman.

In addition to her committee assignments, Burchardt also served as chairwoman of the German-Italian Parliamentary Friendship Group from 2003 until 2013. She did not run for re-election in the 2013 elections

Other activities
 Friedrich Ebert Foundation (FES), Member of the Board of Trustees
 Max Planck Institute of Molecular Physiology, Member of the Board of Trustees
 Technical University of Berlin, Member of the Board of Trustees (since 2016)
 German Council for Sustainable Development (RNE), Member (2016–2022, appointed ad personam by Chancellor Angela Merkel)
 German National Association for Student Affairs, Member of the Board of Trustees (2009-2013)
 Berlin Social Science Center (WZB), Member of the Board of Trustees (2002-2013)

References

External links 
  

1954 births
Living people
Politicians from Dortmund
Members of the Bundestag for North Rhine-Westphalia
Female members of the Bundestag
Ruhr University Bochum alumni
21st-century German women politicians
Members of the Bundestag 2005–2009
Members of the Bundestag 2002–2005
Members of the Bundestag 1998–2002
Members of the Bundestag 1994–1998
Members of the Bundestag for the Social Democratic Party of Germany
20th-century German women